1969: The Velvet Underground Live is a live album by the Velvet Underground. It was originally released as a double album in September 1974 by Mercury Records. The September 1988 CD re-release was issued as two separate single CD volumes, with one extra track per disc. Since many of the band's studio albums were out of print in the United States from the early 1970s through the mid-1980s, 1969 was one of the more popular albums by the band, and is a fan favorite. Spin magazine's Alternative Record Guide included it in the top 100 alternative albums of all time in 1995.

Recording and production 
During 1969, the Velvet Underground toured the United States and Canada, playing well over 70 dates. By this time, the band had picked up a sizeable fan base and every now and then a fan would bring along, with consent of the band, recording equipment to record a set.

Most of the time, this would mean relatively simple hand-held recorders resulting in lo-fi audience recordings. On two occasions, however, professional equipment was used. On October 19, 1969, in the End of Cole Ave. club, Dallas, a fan who happened to be a recording engineer brought along his professional gear; and in November at The Matrix in San Francisco, the band was given permission to use the in-house four-track recording desk.

The band were given two-track mixdown tapes from the recordings for reference, but nothing was done with them until 1974, after the band had dissolved and Lou Reed had become well known as a solo artist. According to bassist Doug Yule, "The release of 1969 Live... was started by Steve Sesnick [former band manager], who had the tapes and was trying to sell them to get money for himself claiming that he owned the [band] name and the rights to the album... Somehow somebody else got involved and contacted other people in the group and basically Sesnick got done. [Lou Reed's management] took the tapes and said 'It's not yours' and released it".

The mixdown tapes were submitted to Mercury Records, who agreed to release a compilation of the best performances as a double album. The compiling was done by music critic Paul Nelson, who at the time was working in A&R (artists and repertoire) at Mercury. When 1969 was released, it immediately became subject of a lawsuit as The Matrix's management had never given permission for their material to be used on a commercial release. The matter was settled out of court.

The tracks on 1969 are for the most part of good sound quality, resulting from four-track recording equipment being used. Some of the tracks feature light crackling, however, as they were sourced from acetates, the original tapes having been lost. The CD release is worse in this regard, as it appears that some tracks were sourced from a vinyl copy of the album. There is little ambience or audience sound, however, because no audience mic was used and so the only ambience the listener gets is what little the vocal and drum mics picked up. This makes the record sound relatively flat and small and makes it seem that only a handful of people were present.

At the time of the album's release, three of its songs ("We're Gonna Have a Real Good Time Together", "Over You" and "Sweet Bonnie Brown"/"It's Just Too Much") had never been released in any form, two ("Lisa Says" and "Ocean") were previously only known from the versions on Reed's debut solo album, and "New Age" and "Sweet Jane" were radically different from the eventual Loaded studio versions. In addition, much of the rest of the album lends credence to a popular saying about the band—that they would not (or could not) play a song the same way twice. In particular, "I'm Waiting for the Man" (here called "Waiting For My Man") is performed in a country-rock manner; "Femme Fatale" is louder and more aggressive, and "White Light/White Heat" is extended from two-and-a-half minutes to over eight minutes of avant-garde guitar improvisation. The album is also notable for featuring songs sung by different singers from the album versions: Reed sings "New Age" (later sung by Yule on Loaded) and "Femme Fatale" (originally sung by Nico) and Yule sings "I'll Be Your Mirror" (also originally by Nico).

The album contained liner notes by Paul Nelson and by singer/songwriter Elliott Murphy. Despite being present in the gatefold photo with Reed, Sterling Morrison and Maureen Tucker at The Factory, John Cale does not feature on the album.

Track listing

Original LP
All tracks written by Lou Reed.

Compact disc

Notes on CD releases 
When issued on CD by PolyGram in 1988, the double album (which always sold for the price of a single album) was split into two budget-priced CDs. As denoted in bold above, each CD contains one previously unreleased bonus track not on the original release. Many tracks, in particular "Beginning to See the Light" and "Over You", appear to be recorded straight from a vinyl edition of the album (as opposed to being from the same original sources used to compile the initial LP release).

The complete master tapes for the Matrix shows were rediscovered in the 2010s and have been remixed and remastered as 2015's The Complete Matrix Tapes, which, as implied by the title, features the unexpurgated Matrix recordings over four compact discs.

Personnel 
The Velvet Underground
 Sterling Morrison – guitar, vocals
 Lou Reed – vocals, guitar
 Maureen Tucker – percussion
 Doug Yule – bass guitar, organ, vocals

References

External links 
 The Velvet Underground Web Page
 Foggy Notion – a Velvet Underground Web Corner

1974 live albums
Albums produced by Doug Yule
Albums produced by Lou Reed
Albums produced by Maureen Tucker
Albums produced by Sterling Morrison
The Velvet Underground live albums
Mercury Records live albums